Angie Schworer is a stage actress and dancer best known for originating the role of Angie in The Prom on Broadway and for being the longest-running Ulla in The Producers.

Life and career 
Schworer started dancing lessons at age 5. Although she didn't do any musical theatre until she started college, she was a cheerleader in high school. She attended Northern Kentucky University's School of Arts for three years before pursuing a scholarship at Disney Orlando. In 1991, while still working at Disney, she auditioned for the Broadway show The Will Rogers Follies and booked the job and debuted as a swing. She then went on to replace in shows such as, Crazy for You, Sunset Boulevard, Annie Get Your Gun and Young Frankenstein.

Schworer was an assistant choreographer in the 2000 Broadway revival of The Rocky Horror Show. In 2001, she was in the original cast of The Producers as an ensemble member and Ulla understudy. After touring from 2002 to 2003 with the company, she returned to Broadway in 2003 and served as the permanent Ulla replacement until the show closed in 2007. She has been in the original Broadway ensembles of Catch Me If You Can, Big Fish and Something Rotten!. Perhaps her most notable credit was starring as Angie Dickinson in The Prom, a part that was written for her and also based on her. For her performance in The Prom, Schworer was nominated for the 2019 Chita Rivera Award for Outstanding Female Dancer in a Broadway Show.

She also has many regional and touring credits including Annie (Lily St. Regis), Disaster! (Jackie), Mamma Mia! (Tanya), Always a Bridesmaid (Monette), Sweet Charity (Nickie), and Chicago (Roxie Hart).

Broadway productions

Personal life 
Schworer is married to Richard Bird, her second husband, is stepmother to his two children, and is also a grandmother.

References 

Living people
20th-century American actresses
21st-century American actresses
Actresses from Kentucky
American musical theatre actresses
20th-century American dancers
21st-century American dancers
Dancers from Kentucky
American female dancers
People from Kenton County, Kentucky
1965 births